Steven Corbin (October 3, 1953 – August 31, 1995) was an American writer. He was known for his novel Fragments That Remain, a Lambda Literary Award nominee for Gay Fiction at the 1994 6th Lambda Literary Awards.

Born in Jersey City, he studied at Essex County College for two years before switching to the University of Southern California to study film. He dropped out of the program, and began to write while working as a secretary and taxi driver. He published his debut novel, No Easy Place to Be, in 1989. He published Fragments That Remain in 1993, A Hundred Days from Now in 1994, and several short stories.

He died on August 31, 1995, of AIDS complications, in New York City. He taught creative writing at the University of California.

References

1953 births
1995 deaths
20th-century American novelists
AIDS-related deaths in New York (state)
American male novelists
African-American novelists
American LGBT novelists
LGBT African Americans
American gay writers
Writers from California
HIV/AIDS activists
20th-century American male writers
Novelists from New Jersey
Essex County College alumni
American taxi drivers
20th-century African-American writers
20th-century American LGBT people
African-American male writers